José García Lorenzana (born 28 May 1900, date of death unknown) was a Spanish sprinter. He competed in the men's 400 metres at the 1920 Summer Olympics.

References

External links
 

1900 births
Year of death missing
Athletes (track and field) at the 1920 Summer Olympics
Spanish male sprinters
Olympic athletes of Spain
Place of birth missing